"Ratpi World" is a song by French artist Booba released in 2021. The song peaked atop on the French Singles Chart.

Charts

References

2021 singles
2021 songs
French-language songs
SNEP Top Singles number-one singles
French hip hop songs